The Sala Polivalentă is a multi-purpose arena currently under construction in Tulcea, Romania.

References
  

Indoor arenas under construction in Romania 
Tulcea 
Basketball venues in Romania 
Boxing venues in Romania
Gymnastics venues in Romania 
Handball venues in Romania 
Mixed martial arts venues in Romania 
Table tennis venues in Romania 
Tennis venues in Romania
Indoor arenas in Romania
Sports venues in Romania 
Music venues in Romania
Sport in Tulcea County